Raul Santos Seixas (28 June 1945 – 21 August 1989) was a Brazilian rock composer, singer, songwriter and producer. He is sometimes called the "Father of Brazilian Rock" and "Maluco Beleza", the last one roughly translated as "Groovy Nutcase". He was born in Salvador (Bahia), Brazil, and died of pancreatitis in São Paulo. Every year on Seixas' birthday, legions of fans, including thousands of impersonators (many even changing their last name to Seixas as a sign of passionate admiration), throw a parade in his honor in downtown São Paulo.

His body of work consists of 21 albums released throughout his 26-year career. His musical style is varied, though Rock'n'Roll, folk, and ballads form much of his oeuvre. Raul Seixas also wrote songs that blended non-Anglo styles, including variations of rhythms typical of his native Northeast Brazil like Forró, Baião, Maxixe, Candomblé drumming, and in fact, often used more than one style in the same song, such as in "Let Me Sing, Let Me Sing". "Canto para minha morte" (Song for my death) is a rock-tango of deep spiritual resonance. His debut album, Raulzito e os Panteras, was produced when he was part of a band of the same name. However, he only gained prominence and critical audience with songs from the album Krig-Há, Bandolo! (1973), such as "Ouro de Tolo" ("Fool's Gold"), "Mosca na Sopa" ("Fly in the Soup"), and "Metamorfose Ambulante" ("Walking Metamorphosis"). Raul Seixas developed a musical style that emphasized the free-spirit and the mystic. His album Gita (1974), influenced by figures such as Aleister Crowley, expresses his views directly. Although Raul Seixas never described himself as an adept of Tropicália (Os Mutantes, Caetano Veloso, Gilberto Gil, Tom Zé, Gal Costa, Jorge Ben Jor, etc), his openness to exploring and mingling sounds and rhythms of different times and cultures with an iconoclastic shows that Tropicália did seem to have a degree of influence in Raul Seixas' artistic output. 

Many songs in Gita were co-written with his frequent collaborator, then-fellow mystic and future worldwide bestselling author Paulo Coelho. Raul was interested in philosophy (especially metaphysics and ontology), psychology, history, literature and Latin. In October 2008, nineteen years after his death, Raul Seixas was placed in 19th position in a list of one hundred greatest artists of Brazilian music sponsored by the Brazilian edition of Rolling Stone magazine, topping the likes of Milton Nascimento, Maria Bethânia, Heitor Villa-Lobos and others, demonstrating the influence that Seixas' music continues to hold today.

Biography 

Seixas was born at 8:00 AM (11:00 GMT) on Thursday, 28 June 1945, to a middle-class family residing at Avenida Sete de Setembro, Salvador, Bahia. As a child living near the United States consulate, he became fluent in the English language, and was introduced to early rock and roll records of artists such as Little Richard, Jerry Lee Lewis and Elvis Presley through his contacts with American diplomats' children around 1956. Elvis's music in particular was influential in young Raul's decision to become a musician. At the age of twelve, Seixas formed his first group, The Panthers, later changing their name to the Portuguese-language Raulzito e os Panteras ("Little Raul and The Panthers"). They appeared on TV Salvador doing covers of Lewis, Little Richard and Elvis, a style of music which was at the time called "cowboy music" in Brazil. They were also the first group in the state of Bahia to play Beatles covers and grow their hair long, as early as 1964.

In the mid-1960s, Os Panteras, already well known as the best rock group in the region, started backing some of Brazil's most famous pop singers of the time, such as Roberto Carlos and Jerry Adriani whenever they went to Salvador. Impressed with their talent, the stars would always advise Raul to move down south and take a chance in the thriving Jovem Guarda scene.

Following the promises of fame and fortune, the band moved to Rio de Janeiro in 1967. In the following year they released their first and only album on the Odeon label (later EMI-Odeon), which included a Portuguese language version of the Beatles' song "Lucy in the Sky with Diamonds" among many original numbers. Without any publicity, the record sunk and the band disbanded. Seixas was totally shaken by the failure of the Panthers, and his return to Salvador. He wrote: "I spent all day locked in my room reading philosophy, with only a very feeble light, what ended up spoiling my eyesight [...] I bought a motorcycle and did crazy things in the street."

After his former bandmates moved back to Salvador, Seixas made a living as an English teacher before being hired by CBS, still in 1968, as creative director and record producer. In 1971, tired of writing and producing records by bland, commercial artists, he took advantage of a label director's vacations and produced Sociedade da Grã-Ordem Kavernista Apresenta Sessão das Dez, an avant-garde album featuring himself, singer Sergio Sampaio, samba artist Miriam Batucada and Edy Star. The record's mix of Tropicalia, rock and roll and anarchic surrealistic experiments launched Raul Seixas as an icon of Brazilian counterculture.

In the 1970s, Seixas became popular in urban centers such as Rio de Janeiro and São Paulo. Music broadcast on TV and radio was satirical, sarcastic with esoteric themes. References to a wide range of historical and fictional personalities are found within his lyrics: The Beatles, Aleister Crowley, Al Capone, Marlon Brando, Jesus, Julius Caesar and Shakespeare, for example. Seixas was subject to censorship during Brazil's period of military dictatorship. Like the music of his contemporaries such as Chico Buarque and others, Seixas's lyrics hide political messages within double meanings.

1971 also saw the beginning of a relationship with esoteric author Paulo Coelho, beginning with Krig-Há-Bandolo in 1973. Through Coelho, Seixas was introduced to the work of controversial English mystic Aleister Crowley, which influenced their collaboration. The influence extended not only to music, but also to plans for the creation of the "Alternative Society," which was to be an anarchist community in the state of Minas Gerais based on Crowley's premise: "'Do what thou wilt' shall be the whole of the Law." The project was considered subversive by members of the Brazilian military, which imprisoned all prospective members of the group. Seixas and Coelho are reported to have been tortured during their imprisonment.

Seixas got into self-exiling himself in the United States following the presumed detention by government repressive agents, where his American wife of the time was living. (Seixas was legally married two times to Edith Wisner and Gloria Vaquer Seixas.) He has three daughters Simone Vannoy, Scarlet Vaquer Seixas and Vivian Seixas. He would later claim that during his exile he had met his childhood heroes John Lennon and Jerry Lee Lewis, although this claim has been disputed.

Perhaps as a result of his drug addiction and alcoholism, the rate and quality of Seixas' releases slowed through the late-1970s and throughout the 1980s. In later life Seixas suffered from diabetes and pancreatitis. At 5:00 AM (08:00 GMT) on Monday, 21 August 1989, Seixas died of cardiac arrest, the result of acute pancreatitis brought on by his diabetes and not having taken insulin the night before. His final album, A Panela do Diabo, a partnership with fellow Bahian rocker Marcelo Nova (former leader of punk rock band Camisa de Vênus) was released two days before his death.

It is very common to hear people shouting "Toca Raul!" (Play Raul!) in the middle of concerts, regardless of the artist or genre, just like the requests for Free Bird.

Discography

Studio albums
1968 – Raulzito e os Panteras
1971 – Sociedade da Grã-Ordem Kavernista Apresenta Sessão das 10 (with Sérgio Sampaio, Míriam Batucada and Edy Star)
1973 – Os 24 Maiores Sucessos da Era do Rock
1973 – Krig-ha, Bandolo!
1974 – O Rebu (Original soundtrack – Raul Seixas & Paulo Coelho)
1974 – Gita
1975 – 20 Anos de Rock (Reissue of Os 24 Maiores Sucessos da Era do Rock)
1975 – Novo Aeon
1976 – Há 10 Mil Anos Atrás
1977 – Raul Rock Seixas
1977 – O Dia em que a Terra Parou
1978 – Mata Virgem
1979 – Por Quem Os Sinos Dobram
1980 – Abre-Te Sésamo
1983 – Raul Seixas
1984 – Metrô Linha 743
1985 – 30 Anos de Rock (Reissue of Os 24 Maiores Sucessos da Era do Rock)
1985 – Let Me Sing My Rock And Roll (Compilation with previously unreleased tracks)
1986 – Raul Rock Seixas Volume 2 (Compilation with previously unreleased tracks)
1987 – Caroço de Manga (Reissue of Let Me Sing My Rock And Roll)
1987 – Uah-Bap-Lu-Bap-Lah-Béin-Bum!
1988 – A Pedra do Gênesis
1989 – A Panela do Diabo (with Marcelo Nova)

Posthumous studio albums
1992 – O Baú do Raul
1998 – Documento
2009 – 20 Anos sem Raul Seixas (Reissue of Documento with a previously unreleased track)

Live albums
1984 – Ao Vivo - Único e Exclusivo (Concert in São Paulo 1983)
1991 – Eu, Raul Seixas (Concert at Gonzaga Beach, Santos/SP 1982)
1993 – Raul Vivo (Reissue of Ao Vivo – Único e Exclusivo with extras tracks)
1994 – Se o Rádio Não Toca... (Concert in Brasília 1974)

Compilation albums
1985 – Let Me Sing My Rock And Roll
1986 – Raul Rock Seixas Volume 2
1987 – Caroço de Manga
1991 – As Profecias (With a previously unreleased track)
2003 – Anarkilópolis (With a previously unreleased track)

Box Sets
1995 – Série Grandes Nomes: Raul (Box containing 4 CDs and Illustrated Booklet)
2002 – Maluco Beleza (Box containing 6 CDs and Illustrated Booklet)
2009 – 10.000 Anos à Frente (Reissue of Maluco Beleza)

Bibliography 

(1973). O Grito de Guerra, O Pasquim.
(1987). Uah-bap-lu-bap-hab-béin-bum, Bizz.
Almeida, Ricardo Porto de (1980). Aluga-se o Brasil: Tratar com Raul Seixas, Jornal Canja.
Bahiana, Ana Maria (1975). Eu em Noites de Sol, "20 Anos de Rock", Release.
Bahiana, Ana Maria (1975). O Aprendiz de Feiticeiro, o Demolidor, "A Glória", Revista Rock.
Bahiana, Ana Maria (1983). Dez Mil Fãs Exaltados, O Globo.
Caramey, Carlos (1975). Eu sou o meu país, Pop Hit Pop.
Frans, Elton; Moura, Roberto Murcia (2000). Raul Seixas: a história que não foi contada, Irmãos Vitale. . 
Mauro, André (2007). O Último Anarquista, Martin Claret.
Passos, Sylvio (organização e pesquisa; 2007). Raul Seixas por ele mesmo, Martin Claret. 
Passos, Sylvio (2007). O tempo de Raul Seixas, Martin Claret.
Passos, Sylvio (2007). Raul Seixas: os últimos anos, Martin Claret.
Pereira, Fabiana Santos (?). Subjetividade Alternativa: O Discurso na Obra de Raul Seixas e Sua Representação pelo Jornalismo, Universidade Católica de Brasília.
Reys, Aloysio (1976). Eu sou um artista, Jornal de Música.
Sardenberg, Walterson (1982). Não pertenco a grupo nenhum, Revista Amiga.
1983 – As aventuras de Raul Seixas na Cidade de Thor – Raul Seixas – Shogun Arte, RJ
1992 – Raul Seixas, uma antologia – Sylvio Passos e Toninho Buda – Martin Claret Editores, SP
1992 – O Baú do Raul – Kika Seixas e Tárik de Sousa – Editora Globo, SP
1993 – Eu quero cantar por cantar – Ayrton Mugnaini Jr. – Nova Sampa Editora, SP
1993 – Raul Seixas e o Sonho da Sociedade Alternativa – Luciana Alves – Martin Claret Editores, SP
1994 – Raul Seixas, Musicalmente falando – Thais de Moraes – Nova Sampa Editora, SP
1994 – Raulseixismo – Costa Senna – Nova Sampa Editora, SP
1994 – Raul Seixas Forever – Madiel Figueiredo – Editora Ataniense, SP
1994 – Raul Seixas Rock Book – Kika Seixas – Griphus Editora, RJ
1995 – Raul Rock Seixas – Kika Seixas – Editora Globo, SP
1995 – Raul Seixas, o Metamorfônico – Issac Soares de Sousa – Gráfica e Editora Colleta, Bariri/SP
1995 – Trem das sete – Luciana Alves, Toninho Buda, Drago, Jairo Ferreira, Zelinda Hypólito, Ayrton Mugnaini Jr., Costa Senna – Nova Sampa Editora, SP
1995 – A trajetória de um ídolo – Thildo Gama – Pen Editora, SP
1997 – Raul Seixas, entrevistas e depoimentos – Thildo Gama – Pen Editora, SP
1999 – Triângulo do Diabo – Opus 666 – Jay Vaquer – Girl Press
1999 – A Paixão Segundo Raul Seixas – Toninho Buda – Editora Maya, SP
1999 – Dez Anos Sem Raul Seixas – Tiago Sotero de Sá & Mirella Franco Barrella – Produção Alternativa, SP
1999 – Luar aos Avessos – Angelo Sastre – Scortecci Editora, SP
1999 – Raul Seixas – Biografia – Coleção Gente do Século – Regina Echeverria – Editora Três, SP
2000 – Raul Seixas, a História que não foi contada – Elton Frans – Irmãos Vitale Editores, SP
2002 – Raul Seixas: A Verdade Absoluta – Filosofias, Políticas e Lutas – Mário Lucena – McBel Oficida de Letras, SP
2003 – Raul Seixas – Dez Mil anos à frente – Marco Haurélio – M2Mídia
2004 – Raul Seixas e a modernidade: Uma Viagem na contramão – Sonielson Juvino Silva – Marca de Fantasia, PB
2005 – Raul no Caldeirão – David E. Martins – Catedral das Letras, Petropolis/RJ
2005 – O Baú do Raul Revirado (Incluí CD com raridades) – Silvio Essinger – Ediouro, RJ
2007 – 30 Anos de Rock: Raul Seixas e a cultura brasileira – Dílson César Devides – Editora Corifeu, Rio de Janeiro/RJ
2007 – Vivendo A Sociedade Alternativa: Raul Seixas no seu tempo – Luiz Lima – Terceira Margem, São Paulo/SP
2008 – O Protesto dos Inconscientes – Raul Seixas e a Micropolítica – Juliana Abonizio – ECCO UFMT, Cuiabá/MT
2008 – Krig-ha, Bandolo! Cuidado, Aí Vem Raul Seixas! – Rosana da Câmara Teixeira – 7 Letras FAPERJ, Rio de Janeiro/RJ
2009 – Raul Seixas – Metamorfose Ambulante – Vida, alguma coisa acontece; Morte, alguma coisa pode acontecer – Mário Lucena, Laura Kohan e Igor Zinza – Coordenação: Sylvio Passos, B&A Editora, São Paulo/SP
2009 – O Baú do Raul Revirado (Audio Book/Audiolivro) – Org. Silvio Essinger, Narrado por Tico Santa Cruz e o grupo Voluntários da Pátria, com Nelson Motta, Kika e Vivian Seixas – PlugMe Editora, Rio de Janeiro/RJ
2010 – Novo Aeon – Raul Seixas no Torvelinho de seu tempo – Vitor Cei Santos – Editora Multifoco, Rio de Janeiro/RJ
2013 – "Lapis de genesi", in 'Alquimia o Arquimagistério Solar'' – Luis Carlos de Morais Junior – Editora Quártica Premium, Rio de Janeiro/RJ

References

External links
 Raul Seixas Official Website (In Portuguese).
 Raul Rock Club (In Portuguese).
 Raul Seixas – Especial Estadão – 28/6/2003
 Raul Seixas – Novo Aeon

1945 births
1989 deaths
Brazilian male guitarists
Brazilian rock musicians
Brazilian agnostics
Brazilian lyricists
Alcohol-related deaths in Brazil
Deaths from diabetes
Deaths from pancreatitis
People from Salvador, Bahia
Brazilian rock singers
20th-century Brazilian male singers
20th-century Brazilian singers
20th-century guitarists
Brazilian anarchists